Presentation Convent High School, Murree, was founded by the Presentation Sisters in 1917, and is regulated by the Catholic Board of Education under the Roman Catholic Diocese of Islamabad-Rawalpindi.

On September 8, 1895, the first Presentation Convent School in the Punjab was opened by three Irish sisters. Today in Pakistan there are many Presentation Convent School catering to the educational needs of around thirteen thousand children in Urdu as well as English medium schools. Some of them include Presentation Convent Schools located in Rawalpindi, Peshawar, Jhelum, Sargodha, (Khushab district), Wah, Risalpur, Mingora (Swat) and in Sindh.

In 2014 it was listed as an historical building under the Special Premises (Preservation) Ordinance 1985 by the Punjab archeology directorate general.

Notable alumni
 Shahzada Jamal Nazir, Former Federal Minister. 
 Azmat Hayat Khan, Vice-Chancellor University of Peshawar
 Samson Simon Sharaf, Political Economist

References

Catholic secondary schools in Pakistan
High schools in Pakistan
Schools in Murree
Presentation Sisters schools
Private schools in Pakistan